Pheriche is a village in the Khumbu region of eastern Nepal. There is a rudimentary hospital in Pheriche that is operated under the auspices of the Himalayan Rescue Association (HRA) which is headquartered in Kathmandu. The Pheriche hospital is open only during the two trekking/climbing seasons (March–May and October–December). Although the hospital was built with Japanese support in 1975, it is staffed by Nepalis and volunteer physicians who are mostly from the US, Europe, Canada and Australia.  
Pheriche was primarily a farming village raising potatoes and buckwheat, and keeping yaks. However, now in the summer many of its men are employed by trekkers as guides and bearers.  There are also many lodges where trekkers and climbers on their way to the Mt. Everest Base Camp can stay.  It is an important acclimatization stopover.

It was heavily damaged in the devastating April 2015 Nepal earthquake, but only one local dweller was wounded thus far, at least partly due to what people were doing there at the time and where they were during the day. The area is a relief and treatment center and an evacuation point.

Gallery

Notes

Populated places in Solukhumbu District
Khumbu Pasanglhamu